Eriachaenium is a genus of South American flowering plants in the family Asteraceae.

There is only one known species, Eriachaenium magellanicum, native to southern South America: Argentina (Tierra del Fuego, Chubut, Santa Cruz) and Chile (Magallanes).

References

Mutisieae
Flora of South America
Monotypic Asteraceae genera